Know Your Meme (KYM) is a website and video series which uses wiki software to document various Internet memes and other online phenomena, such as viral videos, image macros, catchphrases, Internet celebrities and more. It also investigates new and changing memes through research, as it commercializes on the culture. Originally produced by Rocketboom, the website was acquired in March 2011 by Cheezburger Network, which, in 2016, was acquired by Literally Media. Know Your Meme includes sections for confirmed, submitted, deadpooled (rejected or incompletely documented), researching, and popular memes.

History

20072010: Web series origins 
Know Your Meme was created in December 2007 as a series of videos which were part of the vlog Rocketboom. It was founded by employees Kenyatta Cheese, Elspeth Rountree and Jamie Wilkinson, and Rocketboom CEO Andrew Baron in their spare time, when host Joanne Colan could not finish the current season of Rocketboom. They dubbed themselves the Rocketboom Entity for Internet Studies. Noticing that internet memes were used by advertisers who failed to acknowledge their online origins, they found that they could trace their source by using public search tools. They also found that media coverage of memes seemed disinterested in how they began and spread.

Each episode of Know Your Meme covered one meme in detail, exploring its history and context in internet culture. They were hosted variously by Colan, Cheese, Rountree and Wilkinson, who donned lab coats and dubbed themselves "meme experts". Baron noticed that each episode attracted more views than typical Rocketboom shows. According to Cheese, memes were only starting to become popular on sites such as 4chan when the series began, and Rocketboom allocated more resources as their popularity grew.

Wilkinson had also been developing a personal database of internet memes. It was repurposed as a companion to the videos and launched on the current website in 2008. Due to the size of the task, Rocketboom decided to crowdsource and hire interns, including Amanda Brennan and future editor Brad Kim, to develop content. This was then collated by volunteer moderators and a small editorial team. By 2010, Know Your Meme had attracted a large following and was more popular than the original web series. However, it also attracted hostility from some online communities: the website suffered constant DDoS attacks and the controversial Encyclopedia Dramatica said it was "mostly safe for work, which is fucking lame".

2011: Sale to Cheezburger 
In January 2011, Cheese, Rountree and other employees left Know Your Meme, claiming that Baron had created an "atmosphere of paranoia and competing egos" within the company; Baron disputed this and claimed that Cheese organized a "mass exodus [out of] personal vengeance". In March 2011, Baron sold Know Your Meme to Cheezburger for an undisclosed seven-figure amount.

In April 2016, Cheezburger was acquired by Literally Media.

Website

At the end of 2008, after more than a year of growth, Rocketboom released an expanded database with Jamie Wilkinson as the lead developer. As of January 2017, the database contained more than 2,700 entries of "confirmed" memes.

The administrators have a say on what gets confirmed and what gets "Deadpooled" or rejected. Some of the meme entries are graphic and Not Safe For Work (NSFW). NSFW entries have warnings placed along the top of the entry and ads are usually disabled. These warnings may differ from consequences, such as bans. Know Your Meme also has a forum section, blog, and shop. Dr. Sean Rintel, who wrote The Automated Identity blog, described Know Your Meme as "lucrative, self-supporting research that blends the humorous and the serious." As of March 2019, the site is maintained by seven editorial staff members (Don Caldwell, Adam Downer, Matt Schimkowitz, Briana Milman, Sophie Dickinson and Philipp Kachalin) and one developer (Mike Schwab) in conjunction with a group of dedicated moderators. Former staff researchers include Chris Menning, Amanda Brennan, Molly Horan and Ari Spool.

The Know Your Meme website and web series were acquired in March 2011 by Cheezburger Network for an undisclosed seven-figure amount.

Doge NFT auction 
In June 2021, the Doge meme was minted as a non-fungible token (NFT) by Atsuko Sato, the meme's original creator. The NFT was sold on June 12, 2021, for 1696 ETH (US$4,100,000), making it the most valuable meme NFT to be sold to date. It is the first meme NFT to be officially authenticated and curated by Know Your Meme.

Episodes

Episodes of the Know Your Meme show average a few minutes in length each. In a given episode, the KYM staff describe memes and the history behind them. New episodes appear in irregular intervals of time. Breaking meme episodes started in 2010. Separated in seasons, the videos describe the meme using handy images.

Season 2007

Season 2008

Season 2009

Season 2010

Season 2011
Beginning with the 2011 season, the cast of the episodes changed from the original cast (Jamie Dubs, Yatta, Elspethjane, Patrick Davison and Mike Rugnetta) to Forest Gibson and Kristina Horner.

Season 2012
Kristina Horner left the show in early 2012 and starting with the Ermahgerd episode in August 2012, the cast of Internet scientists expanded to Forest Gibson, Sarah Hiraki, Alison Luhrs and Rob Whitehead.

Season 2017
In 2017, a new season that was renamed "Know Your Meme 101" began airing. Many episodes star two hosts being two of these four: Brian Colbert Kennedy, Katie Molinaro, Eric Bellows, and Jon Allen. All episodes narrated by Tucker Maloney, written by William Applegate Jr. The pilot up to episode 7 edited by Lindsay Penn, while episode 8 gave the edit credit to Connel Post Production.

Special episodes

Reception 
Know Your Meme has been praised by numerous publications. Its entries are frequently cited in both journalism and scholarly works covering internet memes. The Daily Dot and The Wall Street Journal described the site as "the Encyclopedia Britannica" of memes and internet culture. Time included Know Your Meme on its list of the "50 Best Websites 2009" for the web series.

Know Your Meme won a Streamy Award in 2010 for Best Guest Star in a Web Series. It won the People's Voice Webby Award in the Blog-Cultural category in 2012. In June 2014, Know Your Meme was inducted into the Web Archiving Program of American Folklife Center at the Library of Congress. In May 2016, the website was cited as a source for explaining the concept of "dank memes" in regards to the political campaigning in the Australian federal election during a discussion on the ABC television programme Insiders.

See also

 Internet meme
 List of Internet phenomena
 Lurkmore
 Uncyclopedia
 Urban Dictionary
 Viral video

References

External links 
 

American online encyclopedias
Mass media about Internet culture
Internet properties established in 2007
Wiki communities
Works about Internet memes